Major Johannes Hardenbergh (1670–1745), also known as Sir Johannes Hardenbergh, was the owner of the Hardenbergh patent of land in the Catskill Mountains.

Biography
He was born in Albany, New York, in 1670. He was Sheriff of Ulster County, New York in 1709. He served as a Major in the Ulster County Regiment.

The purchase was subsequently confirmed and patent was granted to Hardenbergh and six others in 1708. There were some disputes as to whether Hardenbergh's acquisition of the property had been truly legal. Indeed, in 1769 another former British officer, John Bradstreet, filed a claim to  based on that very assumption.

Shares in the patent changed hands frequently, and the terms under which the land was sold or leased were so varied and complex that it impeded settlement of the district and clouded the title to most of its tracts until well after the American Revolution.

He died in 1745.

Descendants
 Colonel Johannes Hardenbergh, Jr. (1706–1786), a field officer under Washington in the Continental Army, served in New York's Colonial Assembly, was Hardenbergh's son.
 The Reverend Jacob Rutsen Hardenbergh (1735/6-1790), Dutch Reformed clergyman, first president of Queen's College (now Rutgers University), member of the Provincial Congress of New Jersey and New Jersey General Assembly during the American Revolution, was his grandson.
 Henry Janeway Hardenbergh (1847-1918), great-great-great-great-grandson, was a prominent architect in New York City in the late 19th and early 20th centuries.

See also
History of the Catskill Mountains

Notes

External links
Early Sullivan County History 

1670 births
1745 deaths
American people of Dutch descent
Hardenbergh family
Catskills
Members of the New York General Assembly
People of the Province of New York
People from Albany, New York
Sheriffs of Ulster County, New York